Şinasi Stage is a theatre in Çankaya district of Ankara, Turkey. It is operated by the Turkish State Theatres. The theatre is named after İbrahim Şinasi, the pioneering 19th-century Ottoman Turkish author, playwright, and journalist.

References

Theatres in Ankara
Çankaya, Ankara
Turkish State Theatres